Xu Wei (1521–1593), other department Qingteng Shanren, was a Chinese painter, playwright, poet, and tea master during the Ming dynasty. A noted painter, poet, writer and dramatist famed for his artistic expressiveness.  Revolutionary for its time, his painting style influenced and inspired countless subsequent painters, such as Bada Shanren, the Eight Eccentrics of Yangzhou, and the modern masters Wu Changshuo and Qi Baishi. Qi once exclaimed in a poem that "How I wish to be born 300 years earlier so I could grind ink and prepare paper for Green Vine ( A Xu Wei pen name)".  His influence continues to exert itself. Despite his posthumous recognition, Xu was manifestly mentally ill and unsuccessful in life, ending his life in poverty after the murder of his third wife and several attempts at suicide.

Life
Xu's courtesy names were Wenqing (文清) and then later Wenchang (文長). His pseudonyms were "The Mountain-man of the Heavenly Pond" (天池山人 Tiānchí Shānrén), "Daoist of the Green Vine House" (青藤道士 Qīngténg Dàoshì) and "The Water and Moon of the Bureau's Farm" (署田水月 Shǔtián Shuǐ Yuè). Born in Shanyin (modern Shaoxing, Zhejiang), Xu was raised by a single mother who died when he was 14. At 21, he married a woman surnamed Pan (潘氏), who died five years later. Though he passed the county civil examination at age 20, Xu was never able to pass the provincial civil service examinations, even after attempting it eight times. Nevertheless, Xu was employed by Hu Zongxian, Supreme Commander of the Jiangsu-Zhejiang-Fujian coastal defense against the wokou pirates.

After General Hu was arrested and lost his position, Xu Wei feared a similar fate for himself. Xu became mentally distraught at this juncture, attempting to commit suicide nine times, such as by axing himself in the skull and drilling both of his ears. His mental imbalance led to his killing of his second wife Zhang (張氏) after becoming paranoid that she was having an affair. As a punishment for this murder, he was jailed for seven years until his friend Zhang Yuanbian (張元忭) from the Hanlin Academy managed to free him at age of 53. It is possible Xu Wei suffered from bipolar disorder, a condition actually recognized in China at this time. Xu spent the rest of his life painting, but with little financial success. However, his paintings have been highly sought after in modern times.

Literary career
Xu was a playwright as well. He produced the works Singing in Place of Screaming, as well as the treatise on southern drama Nanci Xulu.  His most well-known dramatic work is a four play cycle known as Four Cries of a Gibbon. This cycle consists of the following four plays: 
 The Mad Drummer Plays The Yuyang Triple Rolls (Mi Heng) - describes the crimes of Cao Cao
 Zen Master Yu Has a Dream of CuiXiang - a Buddhist story
 The Female Mulan Joins the Army in Place of Her Father - describes Hua Mulan
 The Girl Graduate Rejects the Female Phoenix and Gains the Male Phoenix - describes Huang Chonggu

Xu's dramatic efforts often deal with women's themes and Xu can be regarded as something of an early women's rights advocate  

The British orientalist Arthur Waley, in his introduction to the 1942 translation of Jin Ping Mei argued that Xu Wei was the author but later scholars have not been convinced.

Xu Wei was also a poet in shi style of considerable note. Xu's collected works in 30 chapters exists with a commentary by the late Ming writer Yuan Hongdao. Yuan Hongdao and the others of his literary movement were undoubtedly influenced by the writings of Xu. Of the various arts Xu Wei practiced, he held his calligraphy in highest esteem. Next was his poetry.
A modern typeset edition of Xu Wei's collected works, Xu Wei ji, was published by the Zhonghua Publishing House in Beijing in 1983. Previously a 17th-century edition of his collected works known as the Xu Wenchang sanji was reproduced in Taiwan in 1968. In 1990 a book length study of Xu Wei concludes that Xu Wei can be seen as the quintessential “scholar in cotton clothes” or buyi wenren (布衣文人), a scholar who could not pass the civil service examination, yet became active in the realm of literature and cultural achievement. Many such individuals appeared in the late 16th and early 17th centuries and attached themselves to successful officials or became independent in late Ming China.

Painting style
Today, Xu Wei is identified as one of the earliest Chinese painters to be "closest in spirit and technique" with the method now known as "splattered ink [that] utilises considerable quantities of ink that are practically poured onto the painting surface".

Notes

References
 Barnhart, R. M. et al. (1997). Three thousand years of Chinese painting. New Haven, Yale University Press. 
 Chaves, Jonathan. "The Columbia Book of Later Chinese Poetry." New York:  Columbia University Press, 1986; pp. 310–320. First scholarly presentation of Xu as a poet.
 Liang and Goodrich in Goodrich and Fang, Dictionary of Ming Biography 1368-1644, Columbia University Press, New York, 1976, vol. 1, pp. 609–612.
 Carpenter, Bruce E, "Cruelty and Genius: Poems of Hsü Wei", Tezukayama University Review (Tezukayama Daigaku Ronshu), Nara, Japan, 1979, no. 26, pp. 16–36. 
 Yu Jianhua and Chen Sunglin, A Complete Collection of Chinese Paintings (Zhongguo huihua chuanji) Zhejiang Peoples' Art Press, 2000, vol. 15, pp. 1–51.
 Ma Liangchun and Li Futian, Encyclopedia of Chinese Literature, vol. 7, p. 4904.
 Shen Moujian, Encyclopedia of Chinese Artists (Zhongguo meishu jia renming cidian), Shanghai, p. 73.
 Wang Yao-t'ing, Looking at Chinese Painting, Nigensha Publishing Co. Ltd., Tokyo, Japan, 1996 (first English edition), p. 75. 
 Zhang Xinjian, A Preliminary Study of Xu Wei (Xu Wei lungao), Wenhua yishu Publishing Co., Beijing, 1990.
 Ci hai bian ji wei yuan hui (辞海编辑委员会). Ci hai  (辞海). Shanghai: Shanghai ci shu chu ban she  (上海辞书出版社), 1979.

1521 births
1593 deaths
16th-century Chinese dramatists and playwrights
16th-century Chinese male writers
16th-century Chinese painters
16th-century Chinese poets
Artists from Zhejiang
Chinese tea masters
Ming dynasty painters
Ming dynasty poets
Poets from Zhejiang
Writers from Shaoxing